Streptomyces tsukubensis is a bacterium species from the genus of Streptomyces which has been isolated from soil in Ibaraki in Japan. Streptomyces tsukubensis produces the immunosuppressant tacrolimus.

See also 
 List of Streptomyces species

References

Further reading

External links
Type strain of Streptomyces tsukubensis at BacDive -  the Bacterial Diversity Metadatabase

tsukubensis
Bacteria described in 2013